Professor Dinesh Singh, chancellor K.R. Mangalam University is an Indian professor of mathematics. He served as the 21st Vice-Chancellor of the University of Delhi, is a distinguished fellow of Hackspace at Imperial College London, and has been an adjunct professor of Mathematics at the University of Houston. For his services to the nation he was conferred with the Padma Shri which is the fourth highest civilian award awarded  by the Republic of India.

Early life and background

Dinesh Singh earned his B.sc.(Hons. – Maths) in 1975 and M.A. (Maths) in 1977 from  St. Stephen's College, followed by M.Phil (Maths) in 1978 from the University of Delhi. He did a PhD in Math from Imperial College London in 1981. He holds numerous honorary doctorates some of them being awarded by University of Edinburgh, National Institute of Technology, Kurukshetra, University College Cork, Ireland. and University of Houston.

Career

Singh started his career as Lecturer at St. Stephen's College, University of Delhi in 1981. Thereafter he joined Department of Mathematics, University of Delhi in 1987. He was the Head, Department of Mathematics, University of Delhi from December, 2004 to September, 2005. He served the University of Delhi as a Director, South Campus from 2005-2010.  He officiated briefly as Pro Vice Chancellor, University of Delhi, before being appointed Vice Chancellor on 29 October 2010.   His area of specialization include Functional analysis, Operator Theory,  and Harmonic analysis. He is adjunct professor at the University of Houston and has also taught at Indian Institute of Technology Delhi, Indian Statistical Institute, Delhi.  He is a recipient of Padma Shri, the fourth highest civilian honor awarded by the Republic of India. He is noted for being instrumental in setting up of Cluster Innovation Centre at University of Delhi , an inter-disciplinary, first of its kind research center particularly promoting undergraduate research. He also popularized the concept of innovation as credit.

Awards and distinctions
 Padma Shri- India's fourth highest civilian awards by the President of India "in recognition of distinguished service in the field of Literature and Education", 2014
Career Award in Mathematics of the University Grants Commission, 1994. 
The AMU Prize of the Indian Mathematical Society, 1989. 
The Inlaks Scholarship to pursue the Ph.D. degree at the Imperial College, 1978. 
Mukherji-Ram Behari Mathematics Prize of St. Stephen’s College for the Best Pass in M.A., 1977. 
Best Undergraduate in Mathematics prize of St. Stephen’s College, 1974.
Member, Scientific Advisory Committee to the Union Cabinet, Govt. of India
Member, Jnanpith Award Jury Selection Board-one of the highest literary prizes in India
Elected President, Mathematical Sciences Section, Indian Science Congress Association, 2012-13
Elected Vice President, Ramanujan Mathematical Society, 2013-15

Controversies

During Singh's tenure as Vice Chancellor of Delhi University, the Delhi University Teachers Association criticised his leadership as being authoritarian. In 2013, the President of the association claimed that dissenting voices were silenced, and called Singh's style "feudal and autocratic", and two years later, Bhaskaracharya College of Applied Sciences principal Manoj Khanna resigned from his position, also referring to Singh's "autocratic" attitude. Khanna claimed that colleges were required to submit false affidavits to the All-India Council for Technical Education (AICTE) in order to get approval to run BTech courses, something that was denied by the university's spokesperson.

Singh was also accused of financial and administrative irregularities. A ‘White Paper’ released by Delhi University Teachers’ Association (DUTA) alleged financial and administrative irregularities in functioning of Delhi University, like diversion of OBC funds for purchase of laptops or flagging off ‘Gyanodaya Express’.  The Ministry of Human Resource Development, Government of India, after approval of the President of India (who is also the Visitor of Delhi University) issued a show cause notice to Singh regarding these allegations. Singh responded to the showcause notice denying every charge but HRD ministry turned down his request for withdrawing showcause notice. Noted Academics including ex-President of the Indian National Science Academy, Krishan Lal, former Director General of the Council for Scientific and Industrial Research, SK Brahmachari, Keki N Daruwallla, ex-Vice President of the Indian Academy of Sciences and a host of academics from JNU, Jamia and Banaras Hindu University and Ex-DU Vice-Chancellor "backed" Prof. Dinesh Singh raising concern over the manner in which, "the autonomy of the university was being compromised".

The government decided not to process his reply to the showcause notice as he had barely few months left in his tenure and few senior Cabinet ministers pleaded for no action against him in order for him to finish his full term.

The HRD ministry, on 7 October 2015, requested the Visitor to send Dinesh Singh on 'forced leave' on the charge that Dinesh Singh tried to derail the process of appointment of his successor. However, the HRD ministry had to withdraw the request as the Visitor Pranab Mukherjee was not convinced if the DU VC should be punished with barely 20 days left of his term. The Visitor asked Dinesh Singh not to continue for a single day beyond the last day of his term. However, Dinesh Singh denied the charge of intentionally derailing the process of appointment of his successor and asserted that he will not continue a day beyond his tenure as is being speculated. In spite of just 20-odd days left for the completion of his term, a large number of teachers and students came out to protest in front of the Vice Regal Lodge demanding his ouster.
 Not only did the activists of National Democratic Teachers' Front and Academics for Action and Development (Rathi) protest against Dinesh Singh. but the demand for the removal of Dinesh Singh has seen the archrivals Democratic Teachers' Front (DTF) and Academics for Action and Development (AAD) to join anti-VC protests by Delhi University Teachers Association.  J Khuntiya, chairman, AAD (Rathi) alleged that the delay has been intentional to ensure that Umesh Rai, a member of the team of Dinesh Singh becomes eligible for selection. One of the names included by Dinesh Singh in the search committee for the selection of new Vice-Chancellor is Vinod Rai.    

DUTA has also recently charged Singh with plagiarism and has sought investigation into these plagiarism charges against him. 
 
Singh was instrumental in initiating Four Year Undergraduate Program (FYUP) which met with a lot of resistance from different quarters, after which the programme was scrapped as per the directives of the University Grant Commission(UGC) . Thereafter, Singh announced his resignation  but later retracted it.

References

External links
 Dr Vikas Goswami Oncologist

Year of birth missing (living people)
Living people
Scholars from Varanasi
Mathematics educators
Functional analysts
Operator theorists
Mathematical analysts
St. Stephen's College, Delhi alumni
Vice-Chancellors of the University of Delhi
Recipients of the Padma Shri in literature & education
20th-century Indian mathematicians